In media discourse, sexual content is material depicting sexual behavior. The sexual behavior involved may be explicit, implicit sexual behavior such as flirting, or include sexual language and euphemisms.

Sexual content is a large factor in most content rating systems, such as those used for television programs, films, and video games. Its increasing availability, especially the Internet, has increased people's exposure to sexual content. Such exposure is not always wanted.

Research has suggested that exposure to sexual content affects people's thoughts and behavior, though there is disagreement as to the extent of the effect. Gert Martin Hald, a psychologist at the University of Copenhagen, who authored a study which found  that watching "sexually explicit media" only accounted for 0.3 to 4 percent of behavior changes, said, "Our data suggest that other factors such as personal dispositions — specifically sensation-seeking — rather than consumption of sexually explicit material may play a more important role in a range of sexual behaviors of adolescents and young adults."

See also
 Censorship
 Erotica
 Not safe for work
 Obscenity
 Parental Advisory
 Pornography

References 

Sexuality in popular culture

ja:アダルトコンテンツ